Klemen Gerčar (born 20 December 1990) is a former Slovenian professional motocross rider, world champion in MX3 class in 2013.

References

External links
 

Living people
1990 births
Slovenian motocross riders